Aristaea is a genus of moths in the family Gracillariidae.

Species
Aristaea acares (Turner, 1939)
Aristaea amalopa (Meyrick, 1907)
Aristaea atrata Triberti, 1985
Aristaea bathracma (Meyrick, 1912)
Aristaea eurygramma Vári, 1961
Aristaea issikii Kumata, 1977
Aristaea machaerophora (Turner, 1940)
Aristaea onychota (Meyrick, 1908)
Aristaea pavoniella (Zeller, 1847)
Aristaea periphanes Meyrick, 1907
Aristaea thalassias (Meyrick, 1880)
Aristaea vietnamella Kuznetzov & Baryshnikova, 2001

External links
Global Taxonomic Database of Gracillariidae (Lepidoptera)

 
Gracillariinae
Gracillarioidea genera